Dalibor Pešterac (Serbian Cyrillic: Далибор Пештерац; born 14 January 1976) is a former Serbian professional footballer who played as a defender. He spent most of his playing career with Železnik, winning the Serbia and Montenegro Cup in 2005.

Statistics

External links
 PrvaLiga profile

1976 births
Living people
Footballers from Belgrade
Serbian footballers
Association football defenders
FK Bežanija players
FK Železnik players
OFK Mladenovac players
NK Drava Ptuj players
Serbian expatriate footballers
Expatriate footballers in Slovenia